The women's 7.5 kilometre sprint at the 2011 Asian Winter Games was held on January 31, 2011 at Biathlon and Cross-Country Ski Complex, Almaty.

Schedule
All times are Almaty Time (UTC+06:00)

Results

References

External links
Official website

Women Sprint